Lithopoma tectum, common name the West Indian starsnail, is a species of sea snail, a marine gastropod mollusk in the family Turbinidae, the turban snails.

Distribution
This species occurs in the Caribbean Sea, the Gulf of Mexico and the Lesser Antilles; in the Atlantic Ocean off Brazil.

Description 
The maximum recorded shell length is 63 mm.

The imperforate, solid shell has an elevated-conic shape. It is longitudinally subobliquely crinkled. Its color pattern is reddish orange, marked in places with white and olivaceous. The suture is impressed and irregular. The 6½ whorls are subplanulate above, slightly concave in the middle. The apical one or two are smooth, the following longitudinally plicate.  The folds are cut in the middle by two impressed spiral lines, projecting at the carinated periphery, and about twenty-three in number on the body whorl. The base of the shell is nearly flat with radiating stripe and five subgranose lirae. The aperture is oblique and rhomboidal. The white columella is arcuate and bidentate at its base. The umbilical tract is pale violaceous, bounded by a plicate cordon. The operculum is convex on its outside, with a median rib, minutely granulose, and excavated near the middle.

Habitat 
The minimum recorded depth is 0 m; the maximum recorded depth is 10 m.

References

 Turgeon, D.D., et al. 1998. Common and scientific names of aquatic invertebrates of the United States and Canada. American Fisheries Society Special Publication 26 page(s): 59
 Rosenberg, G., F. Moretzsohn, and E. F. García. 2009. Gastropoda (Mollusca) of the Gulf of Mexico, Pp. 579–699 in Felder, D.L. and D.K. Camp (eds.), Gulf of Mexico–Origins, Waters, and Biota. Biodiversity. Texas A&M Press, College Station, Texas.
 Alf A. & Kreipl K. (2011) The family Turbinidae. Subfamilies Turbininae Rafinesque, 1815 and Prisogasterinae Hickman & McLean, 1990. In: G.T. Poppe & K. Groh (eds), A Conchological Iconography. Hackenheim: Conchbooks. pp. 1–82, pls 104–245.

External links
 

tectum
Gastropods described in 1786